Stepno  is a village in the administrative district of Gmina Biały Bór, within Szczecinek County, West Pomeranian Voivodeship, in north-western Poland.

For the history of the region, see History of Pomerania.

Stepno is also part of the Russian place names Stepno-Baltay  in the Irkutsk region and Stepno-Durasovo  in the Samara region, as well as Russian place names Stepnoy or Stepnoye.

In the United States, Stepno begins to appear as a family name in census records in the early twentieth century, used by immigrants giving their birthplace as Russia, Austria, Czechoslovakia, Poland, Yugoslavia and (as "de Stepno" or "di Stepno") Italy.

On the Internet, the domain stepno.com was registered 06-mar-2000 to serve as the home page for a United States-based journalism, media studies and Web design professor by that name.

References

Stepno